Nikša Gligo (born 6 April 1946 in Split) is a Croatian musicologist and university professor.

Gligo's scientific interests include 20th-century music, music terminology, the aesthetics of music, and music semiology. He has been involved with the Music Biennale Zagreb in various capacities from 1973 to 1991 and from 2002 to the present. He served as the art director of the 10th Biennale in 1979. He has been a full member of the Croatian Academy of Sciences and Arts since 2006 and a member of section Musicology & History of Art & Architecture of the Academia Europaea since 2014.

References

1946 births
Croatian musicologists
Members of the Croatian Academy of Sciences and Arts
Writers from Split, Croatia
University of Ljubljana alumni
Faculty of Humanities and Social Sciences, University of Zagreb alumni
Academy of Music, University of Zagreb alumni
Academic staff of the University of Zagreb
Living people
Members of Academia Europaea